the Campaign of Bassein in 1693 was launched by the Mughal General Matabar Khan against the Portuguese in Baasein, near modern day Mumbai. Matabar was victorious and the Portuguese were forced to surrender.

Backgorund

in 1693, during the Mughal–Maratha Wars the region of Konkan served as a base of Maratha activities since it was suitable for launching raids against the Mughals in Deccan one of these refuges for Marathas was the fort of Sidhgarh (29 miles southeast of Mahuli, the Mughal general Matabar khan after waiting for six months, they captured the fort on 20 October, upon hearing this loss, the Maratha generals Khandoji Kadam and Damaji Naryan led a force from Rajmachi and blockaded Sidhgarh by occupying the village below the fort, Mughal reinforcement arrived and expelled the Marathas after a heavy fight.

the escaping Marathas however, found shelter in Portuguese Konkan after bribing the local Portuguese governor, the Portuguese started supplying them and giving shelter to Maratha families as well, the general of Salsette Island Tristao de Mello favored the Marathas

Campaign

Having learned of the Portuguese acts, Matabar khan launched an attack against them, a strong detachment invaded their holding in Konkan, and he drove the native peasants into the Mughal side and captured many of the enemy families whenever found, the Portuguese attempted to offer a fight but were routed after a severe battle, he captured two forts according to Khafi Khan the Mughals then chased the retreating Portuguese in Bassein, they set the church outside of Baasein to fire and halted at Bahadurpura asking Aurangzeb to lend him more reinforcements to attack Bassein and other forts, calling the Portuguese as a source of mischief, the domestic enemies of the Portuguese took advantage of this and sided with the Mughals as the inhabitants of Uran did.

seeing their defeat, the viceroy of goa sent a submissive letter to Aurangzeb with presents to his minister and servants, Aurangzeb ordered the cessation of the war and the release of the Portuguese prisoners as a quarrel with Europeans would hinder the trade and diminish his revenues, Matabar attempted to reverse this by explaining his conduct but failed.

See also
Siege of Hooghly

References 

Battles involving Portuguese India
Battles involving the Mughal Empire
Sieges involving Portugal
17th century in Portuguese India